The Minot Minotauros (commonly known as the Tauros) are a Tier II junior ice hockey team playing in the North American Hockey League (NAHL).  Based in Minot, North Dakota, the Tauros play their home games at Maysa Arena.

History
The Tauros are Minot's 5th hockey team, following the El Paso/Minot Raiders of the Southwest Hockey League in 1975–76 and then as the Minot Rangers for the 1976–77 season, the Minot Maple Leafs of the Continental Hockey League for the 1985–86 season, the Minot Americans/Top Guns of the Saskatchewan Junior Hockey League from 1987 to 1997, and the Minot Muskies, which played in the America West Hockey League for the 2000–01 season.

Season-by-season records

Notable alumni 
The Minotauros have helped over 150 players move on to the NCAA level of play.  The most notable alumni is Blake Lizotte of the Los Angeles Kings of the NHL.  Other notable alumni of the program include Jon Lizotte (St. Cloud State, Wilkes Barre Scranton Penguins), Johnny Walker (Arizona State, Utah Grizzlies) and Kyle Kukkonen (Michigan Tech, Anaheim Ducks).

References

External links
Official website of the Minotauros
Official website of the NAHL
Official website of Maysa Arena

North American Hockey League teams
Sports in Minot, North Dakota
Ice hockey teams in North Dakota
Ice hockey clubs established in 2011
2011 establishments in North Dakota